Bellaire, Kansas is the name of two places in the State of Kansas in the United States of America:
 Bellaire, Sedgwick County, Kansas
 Bellaire, Smith County, Kansas